is a Japanese manga artist. She was born on January 1, 1967, in Tokyo, Japan.

She is married to Satoru Akahori, who is a novelist.

Works
 Ami! Non Stop (Manga)
 Ano Ko ni 1000% (Manga/OAV)
 Chokotto H na Koimonogatari (Manga - Authored one story)
 Dare Nimo (Manga - Hoshi sae mo Nemuru Yoru)
 Fukigen na Aibu (Manga)
 Kimagure Engage (Manga)
 Kimagure Graffiti (Manga)
 Kimagure Growing Up (Manga)
 Kimagure Wedding (Manga)
 Nude na Kajitsu tachi (Manga)
 Oya Niwa Naisho no Koimonogatari (Manga - Shinayaka ni Kizutsuite or Hurt Me Gracefully)
 Princess Army (Manga/OAV)
 She's Kids (Manga)
 Shinayaka ni Kizutsuite (Manga)
 Tokyo Juliet (manga) (Manga)
 Tsuki ni Kiss no Hanataba O (Manga)
 Tsumi ni Nureta Futari (Manga)
 Seuseu Suruhodo, Aishiteru (Manga)

References

External links
  
 

Living people
1967 births
People from Tokyo
Manga artists from Tokyo